Street Hockey '95 is a roller hockey video game for the Super NES released in 1994 to an exclusively North American market.

This video game takes place in an urban environment. Instead of ice, the players play on cement and instead of ice skates, they use rollerblades. Players assemble their squads from nine hockey players who are savvy in the ways of the street. There are six different kinds of urban arenas and five different variations on the "traditional" road hockey game.

Street Hockey '95 uses more than two thousand frames of digitized animation, making it relatively advanced for its era.

Reception
GamePro praised the game's variety of options and trash talking voices, but criticized the music and the controls, elaborating that "Jerky player movements and slow reactions to the button presses can be frustrating and might cause you to spend too much time on defense." They nonetheless concluded the game to be "a decent walk on hockey's wild side."

See also
Jammit (another GTE-produced game from their "StreetSports" series utilizing a similar game engine)

References

External links
 Street Hockey '95 at GameFAQs
 Street Hockey '95 at MobyGames
 Street Hockey '95 at Allgame
 IGN: Street Hockey '95 at IGN

1994 video games
North America-exclusive video games
Hockey video games
Side-scrolling video games
Street hockey
Super Nintendo Entertainment System games
Super Nintendo Entertainment System-only games
Multiplayer and single-player video games
Video games developed in the United States